The Centre for the Study of Financial Innovation (CSFI) is a think tank and registered charity based in London, and occasionally operating in New York. Founded in 1993, its goals include identifying new areas of business and provoking a debate about subjects of interest to financial services. It has no ideological brief, beyond a belief in open markets.

Activities 
The CSFI holds 80-100 round-table meetings a year, bringing together finance practitioners, regulators, academics and members of the professions. Prospect Magazine, in its annual Think Tank Awards for 2012, said: "The Centre for the Study of Financial Innovation retains its good reputation for scrutinising regulations and for roundtables".
Its work programme is built around topics including:
 The post-financial crisis of 2007-2008 debate: how will the regulatory landscape be reformed?
 Europe: prospects for the financial single market and the eurozone
 Technology: the impact of the internet and other new developments on financial markets, payment systems and bank strategies
 Governance: strengthening the financial sector
 Financial inclusion: getting financial services out to those who need them
 Risk management: identifying and managing emerging risks
It also runs four fellowship programmes:
 Swiss Reinsurance Company Ltd/CSFI fellowship in Global Insurance
 Depository Trust and Clearing Corporation/CSFI fellowship in Post-Trade Architecture
 Visa/CSFI fellowship in Identity in Financial Services
 Citi/DFID CSFI fellowship in Development

Publications 

 CSFI has published 110 reports on subjects of interest to financial services since its conception, including technology, new products, regulatory issues and risk management.
 
Perhaps best known is the Banana Skins series  which, for more than a decade, has provided a risk barometer of the banking sector and, more recently, insurance and microfinance. Other recent publications which have received notable attention include Combining safety, efficiency and competition in Europe’s post-trade market (October 2012)  and Private Equity, Public loss? (July 2010).

The Centre has editorial responsibility for Financial World, a magazine published six times per year by the ifs School of Finance, with a global circulation of 18,000.
It has published two books: The Credit Crunch Diaries (2009), by David Lascelles and Nick Carn, and Grumpy Old Bankers (2009).

Funding, personnel 

The CSFI is supported by contributions from more than 70 corporate sponsors, as well as individual members and other donors.

CSFI has a full time staff:

Andrew Hilton, Director

Jane Fuller, Co-director

David Lascelles, Research Fellow

Rhiannon Davidge, PA to the Director

Leighton Hughes, Programme and FinTech lead

Alex Treptow, Content Producer and Video Editor

Jack Kunkle, Funding and Publications lead

Governing Council 

The  Governing Council which sets CSFI's overall direction and reviews its activities, chaired by Sir Malcolm Williamson. Sir Brian Pearse is chairman of the Centre’s trustees. The other council members are:
 
 Sir David Bell 
 Geoffrey Bell	
 Rudi Bogni 
 Philip Brown 
 Bill Dalton 
 Sir David Davies 
 Dr. Abdullah Ibrahim El-Kuwaiz 
 Professor Charles Goodhart
 John Heimann 
 John Hitchins
 René Karsenti 
 Henry Kaufman 
 Sir Andrew Large 
 David Lascelles
 Robin Monro-Davies 
 Rick Murray
 John Plender 
 David Potter 
 Mark Robson
 David Rule 
 Sir Brian Williamson 
 Peter Wilson-Smith
 Minos Zombanakis

See also
 London International Financial Futures and Options Exchange -established by member of CSFI gov council member
 New Financial

References

External links 
 Centre for the Study of Financial Innovation, homepage

Think tanks based in the United Kingdom